A cyborg is a cybernetic organism.

Cyborg may also refer to:

People
 Cris Cyborg (born 1985), a Brazilian mixed martial arts fighter
 Evangelista Santos (born 1977), a Brazilian mixed martial arts fighter sometimes known as "Cyborg"
 Roberto "Cyborg" Abreu (born 1980), a super heavy weight Brazilian jiu-jitsu practitioner
 The Ukrainian military during the Second Battle of Donetsk Airport are collectively known as "Cyborgs"

Comics
 Cyborg (DC Comics), a fictional character appearing in publications by DC Comics
 Cyborg Superman, a persona that has been used by two fictional characters in the DC Universe
 "Cyborg", the working title and initially announced name for the Marvel Comics character Deathlok

Games
 Cyborg, a main protagonist from Rise of the Robots
 Cyborg (board game), a 1978 fantasy wargame by Excalibre Games, now owned by Decision Games
 Cyborg (play-by-mail game), a 1981 game by Integral Games
 Cyborg (video game), a 1982 computer game
 Cyborg, a 1987 computer game by CRL Group

Film and television
 Cyborg, working title of The Six Million Dollar Man, a 1970s American TV series
 Cyborg (film), a 1989 science fiction action film
 Cyborg 2, a 1993 science fiction action film
 Cyborg 3: The Recycler, a 1994 science fiction action film
 Cyborgs: Heroes Never Die, a 2017 Ukrainian film about the Second Battle of Donetsk Airport

Music
 Cyborg (Klaus Schulze album), 1973
 Cyborg (Nekfeu album), 2016
 "Cyborg", a song by WhoMadeWho

Novels
 Cyborg (novel), a 1972 novel by Martin Caidin
 Isaac Asimov's Robot City: Cyborg, a 1986 novel by William F. Wu
 Cyborg: The Second Book of the Clone Codes, a 2011 novel by Patricia and Fredrick McKissack

Other uses
 Cyborg theory, a postmodern feminist theory
 Cyborg (truck), a USHRA monster truck
 Cyborg (social media), a category of social media accounts, a bot-assisted human

See also

List of fictional cyborgs

Android (disambiguation)
Robot (disambiguation)
Cyber (disambiguation)
Cybernetics (disambiguation)